The Parade of Homes is a branded showcase of new and remodeled homes held in several regions throughout the United States. Alternatively known as the Tour of Homes in some locales, it is often presented by the local Home Builders Association (“HBA”) or Building Industry Association (“BIA”). HBA or BIA home tours under the Parade of Homes™ showcase homes, both new construction and remodeled homes. Homes generally include single-family homes, condominiums, duplexes, and townhomes.

The nation's first home-tour organization was established in Minnesota in 1948 by the Builders Association of the Twin Cities (now known as Housing First Minnesota).  The Parade of Homes, presented by Housing First Minnesota, is the largest in the nation.  The event runs twice a year, once in the spring and once in the fall, with participation peaking at 1,259 home entries in a single event in 2006. The first United States Trademark for “Parade of Homes” was registered by the Home Builders Association of Fort Wayne, Inc. and was transferred to Housing First Minnesota in 2010. Housing First Minnesota holds multiple Minnesota and Wisconsin  State and federal trademarks for the Parade of Homes.

The Salt Lake Home Builders Association enjoys having held the first-ever Parade of Homes™ in the United States in 1946.

Some locations allow tours for free; other locations require an admission ticket to view the homes. Some locations offer awards for the best homes.

See also
Street of Dreams

References

Housing in the United States